John Singleton Copley, 1st Baron Lyndhurst,  (21 May 1772 – 12 October 1863) was a British lawyer and politician. He was three times Lord High Chancellor of Great Britain.

Background and education
Lyndhurst was born in Boston, Massachusetts, the son of painter John Singleton Copley and his wife Susanna Farnham (née Clarke), granddaughter of silversmith Edward Winslow. His father left America to live in London in 1774, and his wife and son followed a year later. Copley was educated at a private school and Trinity College, Cambridge, where he graduated as second wrangler.

Political and legal career
Called to the bar at Lincoln's Inn in 1804, he gained a considerable practice. He was appointed a serjeant-at-law on 6 July 1813. In 1817, he was one of the counsel for Dr J. Watson, tried for his share in the Spa Fields riots. Lyndhurst's performance attracted the attention of Lord Castlereagh and other Tory leaders, and he entered parliament as member for Yarmouth in the Isle of Wight. He afterwards sat for Ashburton (1818–1826) and for Cambridge University (1826–1827).

In December 1818, Copley was made King's Serjeant and Chief Justice of Chester. He became Solicitor General on 24 July 1819 and was knighted in October, became Attorney General in 1824, Master of the Rolls in 1826 and Lord Chancellor in 1827. On his appointment to the latter post he was raised to the peerage as Baron Lyndhurst, of Lyndhurst in the County of Southampton. As solicitor-general he took a prominent part in the trial of Queen Caroline and was opposed to the Liberal measures which marked the end of the reign of George IV and the beginning of that of William IV. He was Lord Chief Baron of the Exchequer from 1831 to 1834. During the Melbourne government from 1835 to 1841 he figured conspicuously as an obstructionist in the House of Lords. His former adversary Lord Brougham, disgusted at his treatment by the Whig leaders, soon became his most powerful ally in opposition. Lyndhurst held the chancellorship from 1827 to 1830, 1834–1835, and 1841–1846. As he was in regard to Catholic emancipation, so in the agitation against the Corn Laws, he opposed reform until Peel, his chief, gave the signal for concession. In 1837 he was Rector of Marischal College (later Aberdeen University).

After 1846 and the disintegration of the Tory party over Peel's adoption of free trade, Lord Lyndhurst did not attend parliament sessions as often, but he continued to take a lively interest in public affairs and to make speeches. His address to the House of Lords on 19 June 1854, on the war with Russia, made a sensation in Europe, and throughout the Crimean War he was a strong advocate of the energetic prosecution of hostilities. In 1859 he denounced Napoleon III. His last speech was delivered in the House of Lords at the age of eighty-nine.

Family
In 1819 Lord Lyndhurst married Sarah, a daughter of Charles Brunsden and widow of Lieutenant-Colonel Charles Thomas, who was killed at Waterloo. She died in 1834, and three years later, in August 1837, he married secondly Georgiana Goldsmith (1807–1901), daughter of writer Lewis Goldsmith, of Paris. They had one daughter, Georgiana Susan Copley, who married Sir Charles Du Cane, Governor of Tasmania.

Since his second wife came from a family of Jewish origins, it may be her influence which led Lyndhurst to support the Jewish Emancipation of 1858, when the law which had restricted the Parliamentary oath of office to Christians was changed, leading to the admission of Jews into parliament. Lyndhurst also advocated women's rights in questions of divorce.

He died in London on 12 October 1863 and was buried in Highgate Cemetery; as he left no son, his peerage became extinct. Lady Lyndhurst died in London 22 December 1901, aged 94.

Arms

References

Further reading
Dennis Lee: Lord Lyndhurst: The Flexible Tory – , 318 pages – 1994 Niwot (Colorado): University Press of Colorado.

External links

 

|-

|-

 

 

|-

Lord chancellors of Great Britain
Members of the Parliament of the United Kingdom for Ashburton
Members of the Parliament of the United Kingdom for the University of Cambridge
Alumni of Trinity College, Cambridge
Barons in the Peerage of the United Kingdom
Fellows of the Royal Society
1772 births
1863 deaths
Lawyers from Boston
Attorneys General for England and Wales
19th-century British lawyers
Chief Barons of the Exchequer
English people of Irish descent
English Anglicans
Knights Bachelor
American emigrants to England
UK MPs 1812–1818
UK MPs 1818–1820
UK MPs 1820–1826
UK MPs 1826–1830
UK MPs who were granted peerages
Second Wranglers
Serjeants-at-law (England)
Solicitors General for England and Wales
Masters of the Rolls
Burials at Highgate Cemetery
Tory members of the Parliament of the United Kingdom
Members of the Privy Council of the United Kingdom
Rectors of the University of Aberdeen
Members of the Judicial Committee of the Privy Council
Peers of the United Kingdom created by George IV